Beautiful Star (French: Belle Étoile) is a 1938 French comedy drama film directed by Jacques de Baroncelli and starring Michel Simon, Meg Lemonnier, and Jean-Pierre Aumont.

The film's sets were designed by the art directors Paul-Louis Boutié and
Georges Wakhévitch.

Cast
Michel Simon as Léon
Meg Lemonnier as Meg Lemarchal
Jean-Pierre Aumont as Jean-Pierre
Saturnin Fabre as Lemarchal
Georges Lannes as Monsieur Albert
Jean Aymé as Le receleur
Marcel Vallée as Le président
André Numès Fils as Charlot
René Blancard as Le commissaire
Robert Ralphy as Un passant

References

Bibliography
 Crisp, Colin. Genre, Myth and Convention in the French Cinema, 1929-1939. Indiana University Press, 2002.

External links 
 

1938 films
French comedy-drama films
1938 comedy-drama films
Films directed by Jacques de Baroncelli
1930s French-language films
French black-and-white films
1930s French films